The Defence Health Services Directorate is the branch of the Namibian Defence Force responsible for medical facilities and the training and deployment of all medical personnel within the force. It is a significant actor in the effort to control HIV/AIDS within the NDF.

Organisation
The Directorate is headquartered in Windhoek at the Ministry of Defence Headquarters. It is headed by the chief of staff who is normally a qualified medical officer, the chief of staff Holds the rank of brigadier general and functions as the surgeon general. The roles of the directorate is to direct health policy, provide medical supply and the maintenance of health facilities and training and deployment of Medical personnel.

Mobile Military Health 
Mobile Field Hospital

Donated by Germany in 2013, it was commissioned in 2019. The Mobile hospital is rated as a United Nations Level I hospital. It has a capacity of 40 outpatients a day and 20 in-house patient bed capacity, It has two intensive care units, an x-ray unit and laboratories. It can support a battalion group sized combat deployment. It is commanded by Colonel O. Iindombo.

Tertiary Military Health 
 Grootfontein Military Hospital

The Hospital is situated at the Grootfontein Military Base. It has a capacity for 80 patients, a casualty department, an operating theatre, X-ray facilities and in- and out-patient departments.

 Peter Mueshihange Military Center

Military Health Training 
 Medical Training Wing

A central medical training facility is being built at the Osona Military Base. The Wing is commanded by Lt Col Amutenya.

Deployment
Military Health practitioners are deployed at Sick Bays across all military bases. They also deploy on Peace Support Missions with infantry units.

Vehicles
DHS mainly employs three types of Ambulances

Leadership

References

Military of Namibia
Military medical organizations